The Scottish Rally Championship was a rallying series run throughout Scotland over the course of a year, that comprised seven gravel rallies and one tarmac event. Points were awarded to the top placed drivers and the driver scoring the highest number of points over the season was declared Champion of the series. For the second season in a row the championship was sponsored by ARR Craib Transport Ltd, an Aberdeen based road haulage and logistics company. This was a one-year deal announced in December 2013.

The 2014 season began in the snow-covered forest tracks around Inverness on 22 February, with the season finale taking place around Castle Douglas on 26 October. David Bogie began the year as defending champion after winning four out of the eight events in 2013.

Following the Colin McRae Forest Stages Rally in October, Euan Thorburn and Paul Beaton were declared 2014 Scottish rally champions. In doing so, Thorburn ended the record streak of five consecutive titles for Bogie. Thorburn won the title by five points ahead of Bogie, having won four rallies and finished as runner-up in two others, to Bogie. He was also third in the Border Counties Rally but scored second place points – as Steve Petch was not registered to score SRC points – for the event. Jock Armstrong finished the season in third place, five points in arrears of Bogie, having won the final event of the season, the Galloway Hills Rally.

Jim Clark Reivers Rally
The fourth round of the season, the Jim Clark Reivers Rally was cancelled due to an accident during the preceding day's competition, the Jim Clark Rally, a round of the British Rally Championship. The incident involved a competing car, which left the road, resulting in the death of three spectators.

On 15 July 2014, the series organisers announced that the Galloway Hills Rally – a reserve event when the championship calendar was first announced – would be included as the championship finale.

2014 calendar
For season 2014 there were eight events held on a variety of surfaces.

2014 events podium

Notes

Drivers' championship standings (Top 10)

Points were awarded to the highest placed registered drivers on each event as follows: 30, 28, 27, 26, and so on down to 1 point. At the end of the Championship, competitors nominated their best 6 scores out of the 8 events as their final overall Championship score.

References

External links
 
 RSAC Scottish Rally Homepage

Scottish Rally Championship seasons
Scottish Rally Championship
Scottish Rally Championship